Strigocossus guillemei is a moth in the  family Cossidae. It is found in the Democratic Republic of Congo.

References

Zeuzerinae